Karen Diane Magnussen, OC (born April 4, 1952) is a Canadian former competitive figure skater. She is the 1972 Olympic silver medallist and 1973 World champion. She was Canada's Female Athlete of the Year in 1971 and 1972, and was made an Officer of the Order of Canada in 1973.

Personal life 
Magnussen was born into a middle-class family with a Swedish mother and Norwegian father in Vancouver, British Columbia. She has two sisters, Lori, three years younger, and Judy, six years younger.

Magnussen studied kinesiology at Simon Fraser University. In 1978, she married Tony Cella, the lead singer of a band. They lived in his hometown, Boston, for eleven years and then moved to Vancouver. They have two sons and a daughter.

Competitive career
After being introduced to the ice at age six and a half when her mother, a recreational skater, brought her to a general skating session, Karen Magnussen then kept asking for more opportunities to skate. Recalling lessons on pebbly curling ice at the Kerrisdale Arena, she commented, "The ice was anything but perfect, but I think that made you tough." Her first coach was Hellmut May. Linda Brauckmann became her coach in 1965.

Magnussen's career at the elite level of skating began when she won the Canadian national junior title in 1965. Moving up to the senior level the next year, she became known for her strong free skating ability, and was even compared to then-reigning world champion Petra Burka. Her march upwards in the rankings continued as she qualified to compete at the World Championships for the first time in 1967 and won her first Canadian title in 1968. She was sent to the 1968 Winter Olympics in Grenoble, France, and placed seventh.

In 1969, Magnussen lost her Canadian title to Linda Carbonetto. She was diagnosed with stress fractures in both legs in February 1969, spent three months in a wheelchair, and returned to the ice in mid-May. Though she watched the 1969 World Championships from a wheelchair, she said, "I was planning for next year's competition. I never considered giving up; I always knew that I'd be back." She won the Canadian Championships four more times, from 1970 to 1973. At the World Championships, she won a bronze medal in 1971 and then silver in 1972.

Magnussen was granted free early morning ice time at Vancouver's Pacific Coliseum before the hockey players arrived.

Like her American contemporary Janet Lynn, Magnussen was stronger in free skating than compulsory figures. In the early 1970s, both were competing against the Austrian skater Trixi Schuba, who excelled at figures and often built a huge early lead under a scoring system which heavily valued those skills. Schuba's strength in figures allowed her to win the gold at the 1972 Winter Olympics despite placing seventh in the free skating segment, while Lynn and Magnussen (first and second in the free skating) took bronze and silver, respectively. Since most audiences found compulsory figures unexciting, the International Skating Union reduced their value and introduced the short program in the 1972–73 season. Combined with Schuba's retirement after the Olympic season, this development encouraged both Magnussen and Lynn to stay in competition another year. At the first World Championships under this system, in Bratislava, Czechoslovakia in 1973, Magnussen produced a strong short program (which included a double Axel), while Lynn fell twice in that portion of the competition. Although Lynn came back to win the free skating segment, her problems in the short cost her the title. Canadian sports broadcaster Johnny Esaw, concerned that the satellite feed would end before Magnussen's free skate, paid the Zamboni driver to work faster. In the final year in which solid gold medals were awarded in figure skating, Magnussen added a gold to complete her World medal collection.

Later life 
Magnussen retired from competition and turned professional, saying in October 1973, "I'm glad my folks don't have to worry now about paying my bills. They gave up so much for my lessons, and they never said one thing about it, for which I love them so much. I can help them out now, and help my two younger sisters." She performed with Ice Capades for four years.

Magnussen coached for eleven years in Boston before returning to the North Shore Winter Club in North Vancouver, British Columbia. In addition to teaching figure skaters, she has also worked with hockey players to improve edges, power, balance, and stops and starts.

Despite the elimination of figures by the ISU, Magnussen considers it beneficial to learn them in some form, saying in 2009, "Instead of doing figures on a patch of ice we do it in a more free form, but we still have to get skaters back to basics." The Karen Magnussen Community Recreation Centre in North Vancouver is named after her. To assist young skaters, Magnussen established the Karen Magnussen Foundation.  Magnussen was the last Canadian woman to win the World title until Kaetlyn Osmond in 2018, 45 years later.

On November 28, 2011, an ammonia leak occurred at the North Shore Winter Club where Magnussen was working; she said it caused her breathing problems, hampered her ability to speak, impaired her vision, and left her chronically fatigued. Following the incident and treatment with the powerful steroid prednisone, she gained 60 pounds and developed rheumatoid arthritis, temporal arteritis (swelling of blood vessels to the head), and central sensitivity syndrome (affecting the interaction between the brain and vocal cords). WorkSafeBC inspectors cited the club for twelve health and safety violations. Interviewed by the CBC in December 2013, Magnussen said compensation benefits ceased when WorkSafeBC realized her disability was permanent. As of 2015, she continues to suffer serious health problems and may not enter a rink due to the risk from fumes. The Connaught Skating Club decided to organize a benefit show for Magnussen in March 2015.

Results

References

Navigation

1952 births
Living people
Canadian female single skaters
Canadian people of Norwegian descent
Canadian people of Swedish descent
Members of the United Church of Canada
Olympic figure skaters of Canada
Olympic silver medalists for Canada
Figure skaters at the 1968 Winter Olympics
Figure skaters at the 1972 Winter Olympics
Officers of the Order of Canada
Figure skaters from Vancouver
Olympic medalists in figure skating
World Figure Skating Championships medalists
Medalists at the 1972 Winter Olympics
Simon Fraser University alumni